A political group is a group consisting of political parties or legislators of aligned ideologies. A technical group is similar to a political group, but with members of differing ideologies.

International terms
Equivalent terms are used different countries, including: Argentina (bloque and interbloque), Australia (party room); Austria (Club); Belgium (fractie/fraction/Fraktion); Brazil and Portugal ("grupo parlamentar" or, informally, "bancadas"); Germany (Fraktion); Italy (gruppo), Finland (eduskuntaryhmä/riksdagsgrupp); the Netherlands (fractie); Poland (frakcja), Switzerland (fraction/Fraktion/frazione); and Romania (grup parlamentar).

A political group in Swiss Federal Assembly is called a parliamentary group, which differs from a parliamentary group in the UK.

Examples

Armenia 
In Armenia, political parties often form political groups before running in elections. Prior to the 2021 Armenian parliamentary elections, four different political groups were formed. A political group must pass the 7% electoral threshold in order to gain representation in the National Assembly.

Czechia 
Higher electoral thresholds for political groups discourages the formation of political groups running in elections.

European Parliament 

The political groups of the European Parliament must consist of no less than 25 MEPs from seven different EU member states. No party discipline is required. Political groups gain financial support and can join committees.

Hungary 
Hungarian mixed-member majoritarian representation rewards the formation of political groups, like United for Hungary

Italy 
Italian parallel voting system rewards the formation of political groups like Centre-right coalition and Centre-left coalition

Switzerland 
In the Swiss Federal Assembly at least five members are required to form a political groups, called parliamentary group, distinct from parliamentary group. The most important task is to delegate members to the commissions. The political groups are decisive in Swiss Federal Assembly and not the political parties, which are not mentioned in the parliamentary law.

See also 
 Political organisation

References

Political science
Political terminology
Political organizations